The Paris Commercial Historic District is a historic district in Paris, Henry County, Tennessee.

It was added to the National Register of Historic Places in 1988.

References

Buildings and structures in Henry County, Tennessee
Historic districts on the National Register of Historic Places in Tennessee
National Register of Historic Places in Henry County, Tennessee